The 1896 United States presidential election in Minnesota took place on November 3, 1896. All contemporary 45 states were part of the 1896 United States presidential election. Minnesota voters chose nine electors to the Electoral College, which selected the president and vice president.

Minnesota was won by the Republican nominees, former Ohio Governor William McKinley and his running mate Garret Hobart of New Jersey.

Results

Results by county

References

Minnesota
1896
1896 Minnesota elections